Patrizia Reggiani (Martinelli; born 2 December 1948) is an Italian convicted criminal and former socialite. She was convicted in a highly publicized trial of hiring a hitman to kill her ex-husband, Maurizio Gucci.

Early life and marriage to Maurizio Gucci 
Patrizia Martinelli was born in Vignola, Province of Modena, in Northern Italy. She grew up poor and never knew her biological father. When Patrizia was 12, her mother Silvana married wealthy entrepreneur Ferdinando Reggiani, who later adopted Patrizia.

When she was about 22, Patrizia met Maurizio Gucci, heir to the Gucci fashion house, at a party in 1970. On 28 October 1972 the couple married and moved to New York City. Gucci's father, Rodolfo Gucci, initially did not approve of the marriage, as he believed Patrizia was "a social climber who had nothing in mind but money," but he gifted his son and daughter-in-law with a luxury penthouse in New York's Olympic Tower. Patrizia became active in New York social circles, making regular appearances at parties and fashion events and even became friends with Jackie Kennedy Onassis.  During her marriage, she gave birth to two daughters.  Alessandra was born in 1977, and Allegra was born in 1981.

In 1982, Patrizia and Maurizio moved back to Milan. In 1985, Gucci told her he was going on a short business trip to Florence.  The following day, he sent a friend to tell Patrizia he would not be returning and that the marriage was over. In 1990, Maurizio began dating Paola Franchi, causing both resentment and jealousy in Patrizia. In 1994, she officially divorced Gucci. As part of the divorce settlement, Gucci agreed to pay Patrizia an annual alimony of $1.47 million. By law, she was no longer allowed to use the Gucci surname, but she continued to do so anyway, stating, "I still feel like a Gucci – in fact, the most Gucci of them all."

Murder of former husband 
A year after his divorce, on 27 March 1995, Maurizio Gucci was shot and killed by a hitman on the steps outside his office as he arrived at work. The day he was killed, Patrizia wrote a single word in her diary:  the Greek word for paradise. 

On 31 January 1997, Patrizia was arrested and accused of hiring the hitman who murdered Gucci. The trial garnered intense media interest, with the local press dubbing her the "Black Widow". According to prosecutors, Patrizia's motive was a mixture of jealousy, money, and resentment towards her ex-husband. They argued that she wanted control over the Gucci estate and wanted to prevent her ex-husband from marrying Paola Franchi. The impending marriage would have cut her alimony in half, reducing her annual monetary assistance to $860,000 a year, which, according to her, amounted to "a bowl of lentils". The hitman, debt-ridden pizzeria owner Benedetto Ceraulo, was found to have been hired by Patrizia through an intermediary named Giuseppina "Pina" Auriemma, a high-society psychic and close friend of Patrizia.

Prison time
In 1998, Patrizia Reggiani was sentenced to 29 years in prison for arranging the killing. She then asked that her conviction be overturned, claiming a brain tumor had affected her personality. In 2000, an appeals court in Milan upheld the conviction but reduced the sentence to 26 years. In 2000, she tried to commit suicide by hanging herself with a bed sheet, but she was found by prison guards. 

In 2005, despite rules against prison pets, Patrizia's legal team convinced the prison to allow her pet ferret to live with her. In October 2011, she became eligible for parole under a work-release program but refused, saying, "I've never worked in my life, and I'm certainly not going to start now." With credit for good behavior, she was released in October 2016, after 18 years in prison.

In popular culture
The film House of Gucci (2021) is based on Patrizia Reggiani's marriage and the murder of her ex-husband Maurizio Gucci played by Adam Driver. It was directed by Ridley Scott and stars singer and actress Lady Gaga as Reggiani. The film was announced in November 2019. In March 2021, Reggiani praised the casting of Lady Gaga in the film, saying that she looks like her, but expressed annoyance that Gaga did not meet with her before accepting the role. Gaga stated in interviews that she had no interest in "colluding" with Reggiani, but her heart "goes out to her daughters... I do care deeply that this must be very painful for them."

References

1948 births
Living people
20th-century Italian criminals
Italian female murderers
Italian socialites
People from Vignola